John Ross (1563–1607) was an English barrister and poet.

Life
Ross was born at Waddesdon, Buckinghamshire, and educated at Westminster School. He entered the Inner Temple in 1584, having attended Trinity College, Cambridge as a sizar without taking a degree, and then moving to Lyon's Inn.<ref>[http://www.philological.bham.ac.uk/ross/intro.html The Philological Museum, John Ross, Britannica (1607), Introduction.]</ref>

WorksBritannica, sive de regibus veteris Britanniae usque ad exitium gentis, & Saxonum imperium, historia versibus expressa (1607)Ad Praesens Tempus Apostrophe on the Gunpowder PlotTractatus Apologeticus defending the historian Geoffrey of Monmouth
Memorial poem for Sir William Sackville, knighted by Henry IV of France and killed fighting for him.

References
Richard F. Hardin, Geoffrey among the Lawyers: Britannica (1607) by John Ross of the Inner Temple'', The Sixteenth Century Journal Vol. 23, No. 2 (Summer, 1992), pp. 235–249. Published by: The Sixteenth Century Journal. Stable URL: https://www.jstor.org/stable/2541888

Notes

1563 births
1607 deaths
English barristers
English male poets